São Caetano, also known as  São Caitano  is a city in Pernambuco, Brazil.

Geography
 State - Pernambuco
 Region - Agreste Pernambucano
 Boundaries - Brejo da Madre de Deus   (N);  Altinho   (S);  Caruaru   (E);  Tacaimbó and Cachoeirinha   (W)
 Area - 382.48 km2
 Elevation - 552 m
 Hydrography - Capibaribe, Ipojuca and Una River (Pernambuco) rivers
 Vegetation - Caatinga Hipoxerófila
 Climate - semi arid hot
 Annual average temperature - 22.7 c
 Distance to Recife - 148 km
 Population - 37,368 (2020)

Economy
The main economic activities in São Caetano are based on the textile industry, commerce  and agribusiness especially plantations of manioc;  and farming of cattle, goats, sheep and pigs.

Economic indicators

Economy by Sector
2006

Health indicators

References

Municipalities in Pernambuco